Communauté d'agglomération Dinan Agglomération is an intercommunal structure, centred on the city of Dinan. It is located in the Côtes-d'Armor department, in the Brittany region, western France. It was created in January 2017. Its seat is in Dinan. Its area is 932.4 km2. Its population was 97,080 in 2017, of which 14,166 in Dinan proper.

Composition
The communauté d'agglomération consists of the following 64 communes:

Aucaleuc
Bobital
Bourseul
Broons
Brusvily
Calorguen
Caulnes
Les Champs-Géraux
La Chapelle-Blanche
Corseul
Créhen
Dinan
Évran
Fréhel
Guenroc
Guitté
Le Hinglé
Landébia
La Landec
Langrolay-sur-Rance
Languédias
Languenan
Lanvallay
Matignon
Mégrit
Plancoët
Pléboulle
Plélan-le-Petit
Pleslin-Trigavou
Pleudihen-sur-Rance
Pléven
Plévenon
Plorec-sur-Arguenon
Plouasne
Plouër-sur-Rance
Pluduno
Plumaudan
Plumaugat
Quévert
Le Quiou
Ruca
Saint-André-des-Eaux
Saint-Carné
Saint-Cast-le-Guildo
Saint-Hélen
Saint-Jacut-de-la-Mer
Saint-Jouan-de-l'Isle
Saint-Judoce
Saint-Juvat
Saint-Lormel
Saint-Maden
Saint-Maudez
Saint-Méloir-des-Bois
Saint-Michel-de-Plélan
Saint-Pôtan
Saint-Samson-sur-Rance
Taden
Trébédan
Tréfumel
Trélivan
Trévron
La Vicomté-sur-Rance
Vildé-Guingalan
Yvignac-la-Tour

References

Dinan
Dinan